Ocean Software Ltd was a British software development company that became one of the biggest European video game developers and publishers of the 1980s and 1990s.

The company was founded by David Ward and Jon Woods and was based in Manchester. Ocean developed dozens of games for a variety of systems such as the ZX Spectrum, Oric 1, Commodore 64, Dragon 32/64, MSX, Amstrad CPC, Commodore 16, Atari ST, Amiga, IBM PC, BBC Micro and video game consoles, such as the Nintendo Entertainment System, Super Nintendo Entertainment System, Master System, and Mega Drive.

History 
Jon Woods and David Ward created Spectrum Games as a mail-order business in 1983 after being inspired by the success of Liverpool-based software houses Imagine Software, Bug-Byte and Software Projects. Their initial catalogue was based around clones of arcade video games like Frogger and Missile Command for various home computers including the ZX81, ZX Spectrum and VIC-20.

While trying to sell their titles into high street stores it became clear that the company name was confusing to owners of machines other than the ZX Spectrum. The company was renamed Ocean Software leading to some of its games being re-released with different titles so the Berzerk clone Frenzy was reissued as Robotics and Missile Attack became Armageddon.

By September 1984 the success of Ocean allowed Woods and Ward to invest £50,000 in a new software house in return for a 50% stake in the company. U.S. Gold was created by Geoff Brown, owner of Centresoft software distribution, and specialised in importing American Commodore 64 games for the UK market. U.S. Gold had no developers to port the Commodore games for the UK's most popular home computer, the ZX Spectrum, so Ocean produced the conversions of titles such as Beach Head, Raid over Moscow and Tapper through its external development team, Platinum Productions.

In October 1984 Ocean bought the name and branding of Imagine Software from the liquidators of the failed software house. Although originally intended to be a label exclusively for arcade conversions, the Imagine logo would also be used on a number of original titles, as well as on UK releases of games licensed from Spanish developers Dinamic Software.

In 1985 Ocean and U.S. Gold collaborated again to launch a new label, The Hit Squad, for releasing compilation packages. The first release featured Ocean's Daley Thompson's Decathlon, U.S. Gold's Beach Head, Jet Set Willy from Software Projects and Sabre Wulf by Ultimate Play the Game — all titles which had sold over a million copies — which led to the title They Sold A Million. The compilation went on to sell over a million copies, as did the second and third instalments in the series.

Over half of Ocean's releases for 8-bit home computers were coin-op conversions and licensed games. While initially focused on British licences, such as Hunchback from Manchester's Century Electronics, Liverpool's Frankie Goes to Hollywood and Olympic decathlete Daley Thompson, its attention soon shifted to film licences, with The NeverEnding Story becoming its first movie tie-in in 1985.

In 1986, a deal was signed with Taito and Data East for home versions of their arcade games, such as Arkanoid, Renegade, The NewZealand Story and Operation Wolf. Operation Wolf was the first title to be converted to 16-bit platforms by Ocean France,  a company created by Ocean and Marc Djan in 1986. The studio produced most of its 16-bit arcade conversions until 1991, when the company became Ocean's French marketing and sales department.

Success of film-licensed games
1986 also produced titles based on the films Rambo, Short Circuit and Cobra, as well as the first licensed Batman game. But it would be its 1988 game RoboCop, adapted from Data East's arcade game based on the film RoboCop, that would go on to become the most successful movie licence in history by the end of the decade.

In 1989, The Hit Squad branding reappeared as the new budget re-release label for Ocean's 8-bit back catalogue. The entire series consisted of 122 titles over seven 8-bit formats. Their uniform style and numbering has led to them becoming highly collectable. Meanwhile, the company was working on its next big film tie-in, which would be specifically aimed at the new graphically superior 16-bit computers, the Atari ST and Amiga.

The success of RoboCop established Ocean globally, and it would be Warner Brothers who suggested to Ocean that it produce a tie-in based on its forthcoming Batman movie. The resulting game was another tremendous hit for the company and is now regarded as one of the greatest video game/film tie-ins. The game was used as the basis of the Amiga 500 "Batman Pack", which became one of the most successful hardware/software bundles of all time.

Ocean was voted Best 8-bit Software House of the Year at the 1989 Golden Joystick Awards, along with awards for its 8-bit and 16-bit conversions of Operation Wolf.

Merger with Infogrames (1996)
In 1996, Ocean's parent company Ocean International Ltd. announced they would be purchased by and merge with French publisher Infogrames for £100 million. The purchase was the first key in Infogrames' "Expand through Acquisition" policy. After the merger, Ocean remained as a separate division of Infogrames, continuing to publish and distribute its own games, such as F-22: Air Dominance Fighter., with the UK subsidiary beginning to distribute titles from Infogrames, such as V-Rally.

In 1997, Infogrames' French publishing division Infogrames Télématique launched a European-focused online gaming website under the Ocean brand called Oceanline. The website offered up simplified online versions of a majority of Infogrames' game catalog.

On 8 February 1998, Bruno Bonnell announced that Ocean Software Limited would be rebranded as Infogrames United Kingdom Limited in order to standardize its various subsidiaries under the Infogrames banner. Ocean of America, Inc. was later renamed as Infogrames Entertainment, Inc. Infogrames continued to use Ocean as a brand name for specific titles until the end of the year when the company quietly retired the brand in favour of their own. The last title published under the Ocean brand altogether was the North American release of GT 64: Championship Edition for the Nintendo 64.

Aftermath
Infogrames Entertainment, Inc. began to publish games under their own banner, replacing Infogrames' previous United States subsidiary I-Motion Inc. Infogrames Entertainment, Inc. was soon folded into Infogrames North America, Inc. — a renaming of Accolade — which then became Infogrames' United States division before being merged and folded into Infogrames, a renaming of GT Interactive.

The UK subsidiary continued to publish and distribute Infogrames' titles in the country, later being renamed as Atari United Kingdom Limited in 2003. In 2009, Bandai Namco Entertainment purchased Atari SA's European assets, and the remains of Ocean Software currently lie under the hands as Bandai Namco Entertainment's UK publishing and distribution division.

Tape loaders 
Starting with Daley Thompson's Decathlon in 1984, games on the ZX Spectrum  used the Speedlock protection system, which eventually included a countdown timer showing the time left to load a game.

Games

Licensed games 

 The Addams Family
 The Addams Family: Pugsley's Scavenger Hunt
 Addams Family Values
 Batman
 Batman: The Caped Crusader
 Batman: The Movie
 Clive Barker's Nightbreed: The Action Game
 Clive Barker's Nightbreed: The Interactive Movie
 Cobra
 Cool World
 Darkman
 Dennis The Menace
 Eek the Cat
 The Flintstones
 Frankie Goes to Hollywood
 Highlander
 Hook
 Hudson Hawk
 Jurassic Park
 Knight Rider
 Lethal Weapon
 Manchester United Championship Soccer
 Miami Vice
 Navy Seals
 Platoon
 Rambo
 Rambo 3
 Red Heat
 RoboCop
 RoboCop 2
 RoboCop 3
 Run the Gauntlet
 The Shadow
 Short Circuit
 Street Hawk
 Terminator 2: Judgment Day
 Top Gun
 Total Recall
 The Transformers
 The Untouchables
 V: The Computer Game
 Waterworld
 WWF European Rampage Tour
 WWF WrestleMania

Arcade conversions 

 Arkanoid (1987, Imagine)
 Arkanoid: Revenge of Doh (1988, Imagine)
 Athena (1987, Imagine)
 Cabal (1989)
 Chase H.Q. (1988)
 Chase HQ II (1989)
 Combat School (1987)
 Donkey Kong (1986)
 DragonNinja (1989, Imagine)
 Green Beret (1986, Imagine)
 Galivan (1986, Imagine)
 Gryzor (Contra) (1987)
 Guerrilla War (1988, Imagine)
 Hunchback (1984)
 Hyper Sports (1985, Imagine)
 Konami's Golf (1986, Imagine)
 Konami's Tennis (1986, Imagine)
 The Legend of Kage (1987, Imagine)
 MagMax (1987, Imagine)
 Midnight Resistance (1990)
 Mikie (1985, Imagine)
 The NewZealand Story (1989)
 Operation Thunderbolt (1990)
 Operation Wolf (1989)
 Pang (1990)
 Ping Pong (1986, Imagine)
 Psycho Soldier (1987, Imagine)
 Rainbow Islands (1990)
 Rastan (1988, Imagine)
 Renegade (1986, Imagine)
 Salamander (1988)
 Shadow Warriors (1990)
 Slap Fight (1987, Imagine)
 Space Gun (1992)
 Terra Cresta (1986, Imagine)
 Toki (1991)

Other games 

 90 Minutes European Prime Goal (SNES PAL) (1995)
 Animal (1996)
 Armageddon (1983)
 Battle Command (1990)
 Beach Volley (1989)
 Burnin' Rubber (1990)
 Cavelon (1984)
 Central Intelligence (1994) (included in Ocean Classics on Steam)
 Cheesy (1996)
 Choplifter III (1994)
 ClayFighter (SNES PAL) (1994)
 Claymates (SNES PAL) (1993)
 Daley Thompson's Decathlon (1984)
 Daley Thompson's Olympic Challenge (1988)
 Daley Thompson's Star Events (1985)
 Daley Thompson's Supertest (1985)
 Digger Dan (1983)
 Doom (SNES PAL) (1996)
 Eco (1987)
 EF2000 (1997)
 Elf (1991)
 Epic (1992)
 F29 Retaliator (1990)
 FIFA International Soccer (SNES PAL) (1994)
 Fighters Destiny (Nintendo 64) (1998)
 Fighters Destiny 2 (Nintendo 64) (1999)
 The Great Escape (1986)
 GT Racing 97 (1997)
 Head over Heels (1987)
 Helikopter Jagd (1986)
 Hunchback II (1985) 
 Island of Death (1983)
 Inferno (1994)
 Ivanhoe (1990)
 Jelly Boy (1995)
 Jersey Devil (1997)
 Kid Chaos, also known as Kid Vicious (1994)
 Kong (1983)
 Kong Strikes Back! (1984)
 Last Rites (1997)
 Lost Patrol (1990)
 Madden NFL '95 (SNES PAL) (1994)
 Match Day (1985)
 Match Day II (1987)
 Micro Machines (SNES & Game Boy) (1994)
 Micro Machines 2: Turbo Tournament (SNES & Game Boy) (1996)
 Mr. Nutz (1993)
 Mr. Nutz: Hoppin' Mad (1994)
 Mr. Wimpy (1984)
 MRC: Multi-Racing Championship (Nintendo 64) (1997)
 NBA Live 95 (SNES PAL) (1994)
 Nightmare Rally (1986)
 Parallax (1986)
 Parasol Stars (1992)
 Pushover (1992)
 Renegade III: The Final Chapter (1989, Imagine)
 Sleepwalker (1993)
 Soccer Kid (1994)
 Super James Pond (SNES & Game Boy PAL) (1993)
 Super Soccer (ZX Spectrum) (1986, Imagine)
 Super Turrican 2 (1995)
 Target: Renegade (1988, Imagine)
 TFX (1993)
 Transversion
 True Pinball (1996)
 Tunnel B1 (1996) (Published by Acclaim Entertainment in North America)
 Weaponlord (SNES PAL) (1995)
 Where Time Stood Still (1987)
 Wizball (1987)
 Wizkid (1992)
 Worms (1995)
 X2 (1996)
 Zero Divide (1996)

Post-Infogrames titles
The last few titles from Ocean before being renamed were published and distributed under Infogrames' umbrella, and consisted mostly of titles from Infogrames themselves.

Footnotes

External links
Infogrames United Kingdom Limited

1983 establishments in England
1998 disestablishments in England
Defunct companies based in Manchester
Defunct video game companies of the United Kingdom
Golden Joystick Award winners
Video game companies established in 1983
Video game companies disestablished in 1998
Video game development companies